Agustín Rosety Fernández de Castro, (born ), is a Spanish politician, representing Vox.

Biography 

A retired general of the Marine Corps, in 2018, Agustín Rosety signed a text exalting Francisco Franco signed by a number of former military commanders. The text justified the Spanish coup of July 1936 against the Second Spanish Republic.

At the April 2019 Spanish general election, he was elected to the Congress of Deputies for the 13th Cortes Generales in Cádiz. He was reelected at the November 2019 Spanish general election for the 14th Cortes Generales.

Notes and references

External links 
 Page at the site of the Congress of Deputies: XIIIe, XIVe législatures.

1947 births
Spanish generals
Vox (political party) politicians
Members of the 13th Congress of Deputies (Spain)
Members of the 14th Congress of Deputies (Spain)
Living people